Honey G (Korean: 허니지) is a South Korean male vocal group formed in 2012. Their members consist of Bae Jae-hyun, Park Ji-yong and Kwon Tae-hyun. Honey G is currently signed to Chungchun Music. Honey G released their first album, 1st Album on August 22, 2013.

Discography

Studio albums

Singles

Filmography

TV series

References

External links
Chungchun Music

K-pop music groups
South Korean boy bands
South Korean pop music groups
South Korean dance music groups
South Korean contemporary R&B musical groups
Superstar K participants